Pat Collins (born August 20, 1941) is a former American football coach. He was the seventh head football coach for Northeast Louisiana University (now known as the University of Louisiana at Monroe) located in Monroe, Louisiana. He held that position for eight seasons, from 1981 until 1988, compiling a record of 57–35. Their 1987 team won the Division I-AA national championship.

Head coaching record

References

1941 births
Living people
Arkansas State Red Wolves football coaches
High school football coaches in Louisiana
Louisiana Tech Bulldogs football coaches
Louisiana Tech Bulldogs football players
Louisiana–Monroe Warhawks football coaches